is a Japanese professional baseball infielder for the Yomiuri Giants of Japan's Nippon Professional Baseball (NPB).

Career
He has been selected as an all-star twice, and was named the Central League Climax Series MVP in 2019. In 2020, he led the Central League in home runs and RBIs.

Okamoto is also a member of the Japan national baseball team, and has participated in the 2018 MLB Japan All-Star Series and the 2019 exhibition games against Mexico.

References

External links

NPB.com

1996 births
Living people
Gigantes de Carolina players
Japanese expatriate baseball players in Puerto Rico
Nippon Professional Baseball first basemen
Nippon Professional Baseball third basemen
Baseball people from Nara Prefecture
Yomiuri Giants players
2023 World Baseball Classic players